Ana A. Escrogima is an American diplomat who is the nominee to be the next US ambassador to Oman.

Early life and education
Escrogima earned a Bachelor of Arts in international relations from Brown University, graduating in 2001. At her graduation, Escrogima served as one of two senior orators, delivering a speech entitled "The Enriquillo Dilemma as an Approach to Leadership."

Escrogima was a 1999 Thomas R. Pickering Foreign Affairs Fellow. She earned a Master of Arts degree from Columbia University’s School of International and Public Affairs. She also received an International Studies Certificate from L’Institut de Sciences Politiques in Paris, France.

Career
Escrogima is a career member of the Senior Foreign Service, with the rank of Counselor. She currently serves as Consul General of the U.S. Consulate General in Montreal, Canada. Escrogima was previously the Director of the Regional and Multilateral Affairs Office in the Bureau of Near Eastern Affairs within the United States Department of State. She also served as Deputy Chief of Mission of the Yemen Affairs Unit in Riyadh, Saudi Arabia, as well as the Public Affairs Officer at the U.S. Embassy in Algiers, Algeria, and as the Deputy Director for Syria, in the Near Eastern Affairs Bureau. Escrogima has also served at the State Department as Special Assistant to the Under Secretary for Political Affairs, as Deputy Director of the Near Eastern Affairs Bureau in the Office of Press and Public Diplomacy, and as the Arabic Language Spokesperson at the Arabic Regional Media Hub in Dubai, UAE.

Ambassador to Oman
On January 3, 2023, President Joe Biden nominated Escrogima to serve as the next ambassador to Oman. Her nomination is pending before the Senate Foreign Relations Committee.

Personal life
Escrogima speaks Arabic, Spanish and French. She is of Dominican heritage.

References

Living people
United States Department of State officials
United States Foreign Service personnel
Brown University alumni
School of International and Public Affairs, Columbia University alumni
American people of Dominican Republic descent
Year of birth missing (living people)
American women diplomats